The streak-breasted woodpecker (Picus viridanus) is a species of bird in the family Picidae.

It is found from far southeastern Bangladesh to central Malay Peninsula. Its natural habitats are subtropical or tropical moist lowland forest and subtropical or tropical mangrove forest.

References

streak-breasted woodpecker
Birds of the Malay Peninsula
Birds of Myanmar
streak-breasted woodpecker
streak-breasted woodpecker
Taxonomy articles created by Polbot